The Independent Police Conduct Authority (IPCA) is an independent civilian oversight body that considers complaints against the New Zealand Police and oversees their conduct. It derives its responsibilities and powers from the Independent Police Conduct Authority Act. Under section 12.1 of the Act, the Authority's functions are to receive complaints alleging misconduct or neglect of duty by police employees; or concerning any practice, policy, or procedure of New Zealand Police and to take action as contemplated by the Act. It may also investigate any police incident involving death or serious bodily harm and make recommendations to the Commissioner of Police based on those investigations.

The Authority also monitors conditions of detention and treatment of detainees in police custody. In this respect, the IPCA is one of several 'national preventive mechanisms' designated in 2007 under an amendment to the Crimes of Torture Act. Other agencies with responsibility for monitoring places of detention include the Human Rights Commission, the Children's Commissioner and the Ombudsmen. Together, these agencies including the IPCA, have joint responsibility to uphold New Zealand's commitment to the Optional Protocol to the United Nations Convention Against Torture and Other Forms of Cruel, Inhuman and Degrading Treatment (OPCAT).

History 
Prior to 1989, complaints against the police were investigated internally by police. Following several years of debate about police accountability, sparked in part by the role of Police during the 1981 South Africa rugby union tour of New Zealand, the Police Complaints Authority was established on 1 April 1989. The Police Complaints Authority was made up by a single investigator and a small support staff. The first Authority was High Court Judge Peter Quilliam. Because of its reliance on police to investigate themselves, the Authority was perceived as not being independent. Allan Galbraith, was appointed as the Authority's first Manager of Investigations in 2003 and held that position until 2010. He had been a member of the New Zealand Police for 37 years.

In 2004, a number of historic sexual misconduct allegations dating from the 1980s were made against both serving and former police officers. During that year, Prime Minister Helen Clark announced a Commission would be established to carry out an independent investigation into the way in which the New Zealand Police had dealt with allegations of sexual assault. The investigation was conducted by Dame Margaret Bazley and took three years. It reviewed 313 complaints of sexual assault against 222 police officers, including 141 that Dame Margaret said were credible enough for legal action.

Dame Margaret's inquiry identified the inadequacy of police investigations into misconduct by their own officers and recommended that a more independent investigative body was needed. In November 2007, the Independent Police Conduct Authority was established as a Board of up to five members headed by a Judge. The new Authority was mandated to focus on conducting investigations independent from police.

Membership 
At its inception, the new authority was headed by High Court Judge, Lowell Goddard. And in August 2010, parliament appointed three new board members to the authority: Angela Hauk-Willis, a former deputy secretary of treasury, with special responsibility for corporate governance, Maori responsiveness, and ethics and integrity; Dianne Macaskill chief executive and chief archivist at Archives New Zealand from 2001 to 2009; and Richard Woods, who from 1999 to 2006, was the director of the New Zealand Security Intelligence Service, and from 2008 was chairperson of the Environmental Risk Management Authority.

In April 2012, Judge Sir David Carruthers, former chairman of the New Zealand Parole Board, was appointed chair of the Independent Police Conduct Authority for a term of five years. Soon after he took over, he said he wanted to see more of the watchdog's work opened to public scrutiny.

In 2015 Parliament approved a Notice of Motion reappointing Dianne Macaskill and appointing Simon Murdoch CNZM as part time members of the Authority for a term of three years.

Judge Sir David Carruthers retired in August 2017 and was succeeded by Judge Colin Doherty as chair of the authority for a term of five years.

Investigators 
The IPCA employs 25–30 full-time staff including investigators, analysts, legal advisors, communications and support staff. The official website indicates that its current and former investigators have backgrounds in police and other investigative work in Australia, Canada, England, Scotland, New Zealand and other jurisdictions. Their collective experience includes investigation of homicides, organised crime, drug enforcement, fraud and corruption, terrorism, war crimes, and a wide range of other criminal conduct.

The Authority's team-approach to its work ensures that no one person is solely responsible for the decision-making processes around investigations and their outcomes and that the appropriate expertise and level of independence is applied in every case.

IPCA Chairpersons 
Hon. Justice Sir Peter Quilliam (1989 – 1992)
Hon. Justice Sir John Jeffries (1992 – 1997)
Judge Neville Clarke Jaine (July 1997 – June 2000)
Judge Ian Borrin (2000 – 2007)
Hon. Justice Lowell Goddard QC (2007 – 2012)
Judge Sir David Carruthers KNZM (April 2012 – August 2017)
Judge Colin Doherty (appointed August 2017 for a five-year term)

Resolution of complaints 
The Authority receives about 2500 complaints and incident reports every year, After gathering information an assessment is made on the appropriate resolution approach to be adopted.

Where considered appropriate, the Authority will independently investigate a complaint or incident; however a number of matters are referred to police each year for either investigation or resolution by way of mutual agreement with the complainant. The IPCA oversees the police handling of these complaints, usually by conducting a review or audit of the police investigation after it is completed.

In cases involving fatalities or allegations of serious misconduct, the Authority conducts its own investigations. It may also investigate incidents in which there is a significant public interest in having an independent investigation, for example when allegations are made against a senior police officer. If a complaint may lead to an officer being charged with a criminal offence, the police are required to conduct an investigation, as the IPCA does not have the power to lay charges. However, the IPCA can conduct a parallel investigation, oversee or directing the police investigation, or reviewing the police investigation once it is completed.

Police Association President Greg O'Connor in 2013 said the reason most complaints to the IPCA weren't investigated was because they were "frivolous" and made by "perennial complainers who complain about everything to everyone".

Independence and effectiveness
The IPCA is independent from the New Zealand Police. It is not part of the police and is required to make its findings based on the facts and the law. It does not answer to the police or anyone else over those findings and in this sense, its independence is similar to that of a Court. The Authority's status as an independent Crown entity means that there is no political involvement in its operations. Chair, Judge Sir David Carruthers stated that he believes the IPCA should be able to conduct "own motion" investigations, similar to those conducted by the Ombudsman. He said there were stories in the media about police conduct and behaviour where the IPCA does not necessarily receive a formal complaint, meaning no independent investigation is conducted.

The IPCA has no ability to prosecute police, and can only make recommendations, which the police are not obliged to follow. In 2013, Sir David Carruthers, who had just been named the IPCA's head, said that he was considering supporting new powers of arrest and prosecution for the Authority. In does not make all its findings public. After an IPCA investigation, following a complaint from Mii Teokotaia of Tokoroa after she was arrested in the 2005, before the charges were dropped, the IPCA "deemed them not of sufficient public interest" to release the report, despite senior Police involvement. The IPCA chairman said in February 2013 that the IPCA is "now likely to reporting on all investigations unless there's an overwhelming private interest that's paramount."

Concerns have been raised that the ICPA is slow to release reports, however in response to these concerns the IPCA stated "the IPCA takes great care with its investigations and releases its reports once it is fully satisfied they are thorough, accurate, balanced and complete. Justice will always be our priority over speed." In February 2013, IPCA chairman Sir David Carruthers said he hoped to speed inquiries up acknowledging that it is "very cruel on everybody, families, victims and police officers too when investigations dragged on over years".

Significant IPCA reports 

The Authority regularly releases reports on its investigations and makes these publicly available on its website. Historical reports are also available as is information about its operations including Annual reports, Statements of Intent and Statements of Performance Expectations.

Deaths from police pursuits: In 2009, the IPCA released a report which found that out of 137 recent chases, only 31 were started because of known criminal activity. The IPCA recommended that the decision to pursue be based on known facts, rather than general suspicion or speculation about the offender and suggested police make "the risk to public safety from not stopping an offender" the main consideration, however Police have chosen not to implement this recommendation. After the deaths of three people in a police pursuit in 2012, the IPCA recommended that pursuit policy would should require officers to "state a reason for beginning a pursuit." It also recommended compulsory alcohol and drug testing of police officers involved in fatal incidents.

Police involved shootings: The IPCA is required to investigate all police shootings and has found that in all seven police shootings in the past ten years, that Police were lawfully justified in using lethal force to defend themselves.

Child abuse cases: In 2011, the IPCA released a report on the outcome of its Inquiry into Police handling of child abuse cases which began in August 2009. This followed a Police report in 2008 which found widespread failings in management of child abuse cases in the Wairarapa District. Those failings included poor case management and workload management, poor supervision, and a lack of accountability and responsibility. Submissions were sought, and the Authority conducted an audit of child abuse cases throughout New Zealand, investigating individual complaints about police responses to child abuse allegations. The IPCA chairman, Justice Lowell Goddard, said the scale of the inquiry had been unprecedented for the Authority and concluded "there were serious failures in the Police investigation of child abuse, which must never be repeated". The IPCA made 34 recommendations. The police responded positively, and Commissioner Howard Broad established a Child Protection Implementation Project Team that has since led substantial changes to police policies, practices, and procedures.

Deaths in police custody: In June 2012 the IPCA released a comprehensive report on deaths in police custody between 2000 and 2010. The report revealed there had been 27 such deaths in the last ten years and raised serious concerns about inadequate risk assessment procedures used by police. Following their review, the IPCA made 20 recommendations, including better training being provided to officers about the dangers associated with restraining people in a prone position with their hands tied behind their back and that detainees who are unconscious or semi-conscious and cannot answer questions and/or physically look after themselves "must be taken to hospital".

Treatment of teenagers in police cells: In October 2012, the Authority issued a report on the treatment of teenagers held in police cells following reports in January 2012 about two young girls who were detained and strip-searched by Upper Hutt police. The IPCA launched a wider investigation which found that the number of youths being held in police cells has more than doubled since 2009. It said that "youths in crisis are being locked up in police cells and denied their human rights." Police practices that "are, or risk being, inconsistent with accepted human rights" include: being held in solitary confinement; having cell lights on 24 hours a day; family members being prevented access; and not being allowed to see the doctor when they have medical or mental health problems. The IPCA made 24 recommendations into how police can improve the detention and treatment of young people in custody.

Urewera raids: In May 2013, the IPCA released its report into police action during the Urewera raids which occurred on 15 October 2007. It said police were justified in undertaking the operation but police acted illegally when they entered the homes of people who were not suspects and gave them reason to think they were detained while their houses were searched. The road blocks established by police at Ruatoki and Taneatua used to detain and search people were also "unlawful, unjustified and unreasonable". Chairman Sir David Carruthers said: "The authority recommends that police re-engage with Tuhoe and take appropriate steps to build bridges with the Ruatoki community."

See also 
 Police corruption in New Zealand

References 

Specialist law enforcement agencies of New Zealand
Organizations established in 1989
1989 establishments in New Zealand